The Barefoot Contessa is a 1954 American drama film written and directed by Joseph L. Mankiewicz about the life and loves of fictional Spanish sex symbol Maria Vargas. It stars Humphrey Bogart, Ava Gardner, and Edmond O'Brien. The film's slow-paced plot focuses on social positioning and high-powered politics within the world of film and high society.

For his performance, O'Brien won the Academy Award for Best Supporting Actor and the corresponding Golden Globe. Mankiewicz was nominated for the Academy Award for Best Original Screenplay.

The majority of the film is explained by Harry Dawes (Bogart), narrating the events, with small sections narrated by Oscar Muldoon (O'Brien).

Plot 

Down on his luck, a washed-up movie director and writer Harry Dawes is reduced to working for abusive, emotionally stunted business tycoon Kirk Edwards, who has decided that he wants to produce a film to boost his monumental ego. Looking for a glamorous leading lady, they go to a Madrid night club to see a dancer named Maria Vargas, about whom Kirk had already been told.

Maria is a blithe but proud spirit who likes to go barefoot and has a troubled home life. Maria immediately likes Harry, whose work she knows, but takes an instant dislike to Kirk. Although she flees during their meeting, Harry tracks her down to her family home and convinces her to fly away with them to the United States to make her first film. Thanks to his expertise and the help of sweaty, insincere publicist Oscar Muldoon, her film debut is a sensation. With two subsequent films by this team, Maria becomes a respected actress, Harry's career is resurrected, and they become friends.

During a party at Maria's house, Kirk and wealthy Latin American playboy Alberto Bravano become involved in an argument over Maria. Alberto had conspicuously admired Maria during the evening. When Alberto invites her to join him on his yacht in the Riviera, Kirk orders her to stay away from him. Offended by Kirk's attempted domineering, she accepts Alberto's invitation. Also seeing an opportunity, Oscar, tired of being Kirk's lackey, switches his allegiance to Alberto.

Maria is now a great star, but she is not satisfied. She envies the happiness her friend Harry has found with his wife Jerry. Alberto is too frivolous and shallow for her. One evening at a casino, while Alberto is gambling, Maria takes some of his chips and cashes them, throwing the money to her gypsy lover from a window. When Alberto goes on a losing streak, he berates Maria in public for ruining his luck. Subsequently, he receives a slap in the face from Count Vincenzo Torlato-Favrini, who escorts Maria from the casino.

Maria stays with Vincenzo and his widowed sister, Eleanora, at the count's palazzo. She has found the great love of her life, and they wed in a lavish ceremony, in which Harry gives away the bride. But there is a problem. The count and his sister are the last of the Torlato-Favrinis; without offspring, the noble line will die out. The count has a secret. Due to a war injury, he is impotent. He does not tell Maria about this until their wedding night.

On a rainy night, months later, with Harry in Italy, an unhappy Maria arrives at his hotel room, telling him about her husband's impotence, but confessing that she is pregnant. She believes Vincenzo will want this child in order to perpetuate the family lineage. Harry warns her Vincenzo is too proud to accept this, but Maria feels otherwise and plans to tell him about her pregnancy that night.

After Maria leaves his hotel room, Harry notices Vincenzo's car trailing hers, and follows them. Back at the palazzo in the servants' quarters, Vincenzo shoots to death both Maria and her lover before she can tell him about the child. Harry arrives just as the shots are fired. He does not tell Vincenzo about the pregnancy. The story ends, as it began, with flashbacks at her funeral. Afterward, Vincenzo is taken away by the police.

Cast

Production 

According to Turner Classic Movies, Mankiewicz based the film's central character of Maria Vargas on American movie star and dancer Rita Hayworth, who had been married to Prince Aly Khan. According to the audio commentary on the 1931 film Tabu, she was based on Anne Chevalier, an actress in that film.

The Barefoot Contessa is considered one of Mankiewicz's most glamorous "Hollywood" films, and one of the most glamorous of Golden Hollywood, but it was produced out of Cinecittà Studios in Rome. Exterior scenes were shot at Tivoli (the olive grove), Sanremo, and Portofino. Bogart was not on location at Sanremo. The film's Italian production was part of the "Hollywood on the Tiber" phenomenon.

The studio was about to release the film's poster without an image of Bogart, a contractual violation. Bogart had the matter rectified with the addition of a line drawing of his face.

Reception 
The film was praised by many critics for its extravagance, which earned the director many new admirers. Saturday Review stated Ava Gardner was "one of the most breathtaking creatures on earth". Some critics disapproved of the film; the book Feature Cinema in the 20th Century: Volume One: 1913–1950: a Comprehensive Guide called the film "dreadful", remarking that Mankiewicz's "intelligence and ambitious aims too often collide with an astonishing lack of subtlety and aesthetic judgment". Bosley Crowther in The New York Times described it as a "grotesque barren film" about the "glittering and graceless behavior of the Hollywood-international set."

However, François Truffaut wrote: "what is beyond doubt is its total sincerity, novelty, daring, and fascination … I myself accept and value it for its freshness, intelligence, and beauty … A subtle and intelligent film, beautifully directed and acted."

In 1998, Jonathan Rosenbaum of the Chicago Reader included the film in his unranked list of the best American films not included on the AFI Top 100.

Awards and nominations

In popular culture 
The May 1955 issue of Mad (#23) has a parody by Jack Davis entitled "The Barefoot Nocountessa".

The Food Network cooking show Barefoot Contessa is named after Ina Garten's best-selling cookbook, The Barefoot Contessa Cookbook, which in turn was named after her specialty food store which she bought in 1978. The store, which is no longer in operation, opened in 1975 and was named after the film.

A tour boat in the TV series Riptide was named Barefoot Contessa.

Parts of the movie were featured in Lana Del Rey's music video for "Carmen".

Home media 
The VHS from MGM was first released in 1990 and again in 1999 as part of the Vintage Classics lineup. MGM also released the DVD version in 2001.

On December 13, 2016, Twilight Time Movies released The Barefoot Contessa on high-definition Blu-ray. This release is a limited-edition release of 3000 copies.`

References

External links 

 
 
 
 
 

Films directed by Joseph L. Mankiewicz
Films about actors
1954 romantic drama films
American romantic drama films
1954 films
Films featuring a Best Supporting Actor Academy Award-winning performance
Films shot in Rome
Films shot in Madrid
Films shot in Italy
United Artists films
Films with screenplays by Joseph L. Mankiewicz
Films scored by Mario Nascimbene
Films set in Rome
Films set in Madrid
Films set in Italy
Films featuring a Best Supporting Actor Golden Globe winning performance
Uxoricide in fiction
Italian-language American films
Spanish-language American films
1950s American films